Paradesi is a 1998 Indian Telugu language comedy film  directed by K. Raghavendra Rao. The film starred Viswa, Madhav Dalvi, Tanuja, and Monet Quick. The film was shot mainly in the USA over a 93-day schedule and is notable for its visuals. The film was a box office failure.

Plot
The movie is about a mischievous, educated, small-town boy. He is sent abroad to marry a girl of Indian origin. He takes his best friend along and they decide to play a prank and change identities. As fate would have it they fall in love with two girls while still in the assumed identities. This leads to complications and comic situations, especially when the fake identities become intertwined.

Cast
 Viswa (Suresh Nair) as Krishna
 Madhav Dalvi as Gopal
 Tanuja as Jyothi
 Monet Quick as Catherine
 Brahmanandam
 AVS as Bagara Raju
 Tanikella Bharani as Rayudu
 Babu Mohan as Naidu
 Manorama

Soundtrack

Reception 
The film was reviewed by Zamin Ryot. A critic from Andhra Today said that "The movie comes as a big disappointment to the audience whose expectations were raised high".

References

External links
 

1990s Telugu-language films
1998 films
Indian romantic comedy films
1998 romantic comedy films
Films directed by K. Raghavendra Rao
Films scored by M. M. Keeravani